Ban Ab (also Romanized as Ban Āb and Bonāb; also known as Banāt) is a village in Dehsard Rural District, in the Central District of Arzuiyeh County, Kerman Province, Iran. At the 2006 census, its population was 67, in 20 families.

References 

Populated places in Arzuiyeh County